The 2019 Uruguay Open was a professional tennis tournament played on clay courts. It was the fifteenth edition of the tournament which was part of the 2019 ATP Challenger Tour. It took place at the Carrasco Lawn Tennis Club in Montevideo, Uruguay between November 4 and 10, 2019.

Singles main-draw entrants

Seeds

 1 Rankings are as of 28 October 2019.

Other entrants
The following players received wildcards into the singles main draw:
  Juan Manuel Cerúndolo
  Pablo Cuevas
  Facundo Díaz Acosta
  Francisco Llanes
  Franco Roncadelli

The following players received entry into the singles main draw as alternates:
  Sebastián Báez
  Rafael Matos

The following players received entry from the qualifying draw:
  Mauricio Echazú
  Federico Zeballos

The following player received entry as a lucky loser:
  Boris Arias

Champions

Singles

 Jaume Munar def.  Federico Delbonis 7–5, 6–2.

Doubles

 Facundo Bagnis /  Andrés Molteni def.  Orlando Luz /  Rafael Matos 6–4, 5–7, [12–10].

References

2019 ATP Challenger Tour
2019
2019 in Uruguayan tennis
November 2019 sports events in South America